Casanova in Bolzano is a 1940 novel by Sándor Márai. The books begins with Casanova's escape from Piombi, from which he heads into the Alps, to Bolzano. It is here that he re-encounters an enemy from the past, the Duke of Parma, and again contests with him over a woman named Francesca. The books was published in Hungary in 1940, and published in an English translation in 2004.

References

1940 novels
Works about Giacomo Casanova